An apsaras or apsara is a member of a class of celestial beings in Hindu and Buddhist culture. They are originally a type of female spirit of the clouds and waters, who later plays the role of a "nymph" or "fairy". They figure prominently in the sculpture, dance, literature and painting of many Indian and Southeast Asian cultures.

The apsaras are described to be beautiful, youthful and elegant, and are said to be able to change their shape at will. There are two types of apsaras—laukika (worldly) and daivika (divine). They are superb in the art of dancing, and often wives of the gandharvas, the court musicians of the king of the gods, Indra. The apsaras reside in the palaces of the gods and entertain them by dancing to the music made by the Gandharvas. The 26 apsaras of Indra's court are each said to symbolise a different facet of the performing arts, drawing comparisons to the Muses of ancient Greece. They are also renowned for seducing sages in order to prevent them from attaining divine powers. Urvashi, Menaka, Rambha, Tilottama and Ghritachi are the most famous among the apsaras.

Etymology

The origin of 'apsara' is the Sanskrit अप्सरस्, apsaras (in the stem form, which is the dictionary form). NB The stem form ends in 's' as distinct from, e.g. the nominative singular Ramas/Ramaḥ (the deity Ram in Hindi), whose stem form is Rama. The nominative singular form is अप्सरास् apsarās, or अप्सरा: apsarāḥ when standing alone, which becomes अप्सरा apsarā in Hindi, from which in turn the English 'apsara' presumably is derived. The Monier-Williams Dictionary gives the etymology as अप् + √सृ, "going in the waters or between the waters of the clouds".

Apsaras are widely known as Apsara in Khmer, and also called as Accharā in Pāli, or Bidadari (Malay, Maranao), Biraddali  (Tausug, Sinama), Hapsari/Apsari or Widadari/Widyadari (Javanese, Sundanese, and Balinese), Helloi (Meitei) and Apsorn.

Literature

The Rigveda tells of an apsara who is the wife of Gandharva; however, the Rigveda also seems to allow for the existence of more than one apsara.
The only apsara specifically named is Urvashi.  An entire hymn deals with the colloquy between Urvashi and her mortal lover Pururavas. Later Hindu scriptures allow for the existence of numerous apsaras, who act as the handmaidens of Indra or as dancers at his celestial court.

In many of the stories related in the Mahabharata, apsaras appear in important supporting roles.  The epic contains several lists of the principal Apsaras, which lists are not always identical.  Here is one such list, together with a description of how the celestial dancers appeared to the residents and guests at the court of the gods:

Ghritachi and Menaka and Rambha and Purvachitti and Swayamprabha and Urvashi and Misrakeshi and Dandagauri and Varuthini and Gopali and Sahajanya and Kumbhayoni and Prajagara and Chitrasena and Chitralekha and Saha and Madhuraswana, these and others by thousands, possessed of eyes like lotus leaves, who were employed in enticing the hearts of persons practising rigid austerities, danced there. And possessing slim waists and fair large hips, they began to perform various evolutions, shaking their deep bosoms, and casting their glances around, and exhibiting other attractive attitudes capable of stealing the hearts and resolutions and minds of the spectators.

The Mahabharata documents the exploits of individual apsaras, such as Tilottama, who rescued the world from the rampaging asura brothers Sunda and Upasunda, and Urvashi, who attempted to seduce the hero Arjuna.

A story type or theme appearing over and over again in the Mahabharata is that of an apsara sent to distract a sage or spiritual master from his ascetic practices.  One story embodying this theme is that recounted by the epic heroine Shakuntala to explain her own parentage. Once upon a time, the sage Viswamitra generated such intense energy by means of his asceticism that Indra himself became fearful.  Deciding that the sage would have to be distracted from his penances, he sent the apsara Menaka to work her charms. Menaka trembled at the thought of angering such a powerful ascetic, but she obeyed the god's order.  As she approached Viswamitra, the wind god Vayu tore away her garments. Seeing her thus disrobed, the sage abandoned himself to lust and they consummated, during which Viswamitra's asceticism was put on hold.  As a consequence, Menaka gave birth to a daughter, whom she abandoned on the banks of a river. That daughter was Shakuntala herself, the narrator of the story.

In arts

Natya Shastra
Natya Shastra, the principal work of dramatic theory for Sanskrit drama, lists the following apsaras: Manjukesi, Sukesi, Misrakesi, Sulochana, Saudamini, Devadatta, Devasena, Manorama, Sudati, Sundari, Vigagdha, Vividha, Budha, Sumala, Santati, Sunanda, Sumukhi, Magadhi, Arjuni, Sarala, Kerala, Dhrti, Nanda, Supuskala, Supuspamala and Kalabha.

Cambodia

Apsaras represent an important motif in the stone bas-reliefs of the Angkorian temples in Cambodia (8th–13th centuries AD), however, not all female images are considered to be apsaras. In harmony with the Indian association of dance with apsaras, Khmer female figures that are dancing or are poised to dance are considered apsaras; female figures, depicted individually or in groups, who are standing still and facing forward in the manner of temple guardians or custodians are called devatas.

Angkor Wat, the largest Angkor temple (built-in 1113-1150 AD), features both Apsaras and Devata, however, the devata type are the most numerous with more than 1,796 in the present research inventory. Angkor Wat architects employed small apsara images (30–40 cm as seen below) as decorative motifs on pillars and walls. They incorporated larger devata images (all full-body portraits measuring approximately 95–110  cm) more prominently at every level of the temple from the entry pavilion to the tops of the high towers. In 1927, Sappho Marchal published a study cataloging the remarkable diversity of their hair, headdresses, garments, stance, jewelry and decorative flowers, which Marchal concluded were based on actual practices of the Angkor period. Some devatas appear with arms around each other and seem to be greeting the viewer. "The devatas seem to epitomize all the elements of a refined elegance," wrote Marchal.

The bas-reliefs of Angkorian temples have become an inspiration of Khmer classical dance. The indigenous ballet-like performance art of Cambodia is frequently called "Apsara Dance". The dance was created by the Royal Ballet of Cambodia in the mid-20th century under the patronage of Queen Sisowath Kossamak of Cambodia. The role of the apsara is played by a woman, wearing a tight-fitting traditional dress with gilded jewelry and headdress modelled after Angkor bas-reliefs, whose graceful, sinuous gestures are codified to narrate classical myths or religious stories.

Java and Bali, Indonesia

In the Indonesian language throughout medieval times, apsaras are also known as 'bidadari', being conflated with the 'vidyadharis' (from Sanskrit word vidhyadhari: vidhya, 'knowledge'; dharya, 'having, bearer, or bringer') known as Bidadari in the modern Indonesian, the females of the vidyādharas, another class of celestial beings in Indian mythology. 'Vidyādhara' literally means 'possessed of science or spells', and refers to 'a kind of supernatural being ... possessed of magical power' or 'fairy' according to Monier-Williams Dictionary.  The bidadaris are heavenly maidens, living in the svargaloka or in celestial palace of Indra, described in Balinese dedari (bidadari or apsara) dance.

Traditionally apsaras are described as celestial maidens living in Indra's heaven (Kaéndran). They are well known for their special task: being sent to earth by Indra to seduce ascetics who by their severe practices may become more powerful than the gods. This theme occurs frequently in Javanese traditions, including the Kakawin Arjunawiwaha, written by mpu Kanwa in 1030 during the reign of a king Airlangga. The story tells that Arjuna, in order to defeat the giant Niwatakawaca, engaged in meditation and asceticism, whereupon Indra sent apsaras to seduce him.  Arjuna, however, managed to conquer his lust and then to win the ultimate weapons from the gods to defeat the giant.

Later in the Javanese tradition the apsara was also called Hapsari, also known as Widodari (from Sanskrit word vidyādhari). The Javanese Hindu-Buddhist tradition also influenced Bali. In Balinese dance, the theme of celestial maidens often occurred. Dances such as Sanghyang Dedari and Legong depicted divine maidens in their own way. In the court of Mataram Sultanate the tradition of depicting heavenly maidens in dances still alive and well. The Javanese court dances of Bedhaya portray apsaras.

However, after the adoption of Islam, bidadari is equated with houri, the heavenly maiden mentioned in the Quran, in which God stated that the 'forbidden pearls' of heaven are for those men who have resisted temptation and borne life's trials. Islam spread in the Malay archipelago when Arabic traders came to trade spices with the Malays; at that time, Hinduism formed the basis of the Malay culture, but syncretism with the Islamic religion and culture spawned the idea of a Bidadari. It is usually seen as a prized offer to those who lived a lifestyle in service to and pleasing to God; after death, the Bidadari was the man's wife or wives, depending on what type of person he was. The worthiness of a man who was offered Bidadari depended upon his holiness: how often he prayed, how much he turned away from the 'outside world', and how little he heeded worldly desires.

Images of apsaras are found in several temples of ancient Java dating from the era of the Sailendra dynasty to that of the Majapahit empire. The apsara celestial maidens might be found as decorative motifs or also as integral parts of a story in bas-relief. Images of apsaras can be found on Borobudur, Mendut, Prambanan, Plaosan, and Penataran.

At Borobudur apsaras are depicted as divinely beautiful celestial maidens, pictured either in standing or in flying positions, usually holding lotus blossoms, spreading flower petals, or waving celestial clothes as if they were wings enabling them to fly. The temple of Mendut near Borobudur depicted groups of devatas, divine beings flying in heaven, which included apsaras. In the Prambanan temple compound, especially in Vishnu temple, along with the gallery, some images of male devata are found flanked by two apsaras.

Manipur, India
In the ancient Manipur culture of the Meitei people of northeastern India, apsaras are considered as celestial nymphs or hellois as the flying creatures resembling the human female body attracting the male wanderers or any knights who lost their ways in the woods. They were known for their beauty, glamour, magical powers and enchanting supernatural Androphilic Magnetism. They are believed to be seven in number and are the daughters of the sky god or the Soraren deity.

Champa
Apsaras were also an important motif in the art of Champa, medieval Angkor's neighbour to the east along the coast of what is now central Vietnam. Especially noteworthy are the depictions of apsaras in the Tra Kieu Style of Cham art, a style which flourished in the 10th and 11th centuries AD.

China
Apsaras are often depicted in East Asian Buddhist art. They are referred to as feitian in Chinese.

They are depicted as flying figures in the mural paintings and sculptures of Buddhist cave sites in China such as in the Mogao Caves, Yulin Caves, Tianlongshan grottoes, the Yungang, and Longmen Grottoes. They are also depicted on tiles of pagoda, such as Xiuding-si pagoda. 

They may also be depicted as dancers or musicians holding musical instruments such as flute, pipa, or sheng. Generally, they are depicted with a long skirt fluttering in the wind.

Fiction
The Asuras also inspired the Askyas Powers of the tabletop roleplay game Gandariah Lords of Arcanas universe.

Gallery

See also

 Angel
 Diwata
 Angkor Wat
 Architecture of Cambodia
 Art of Champa
 Dakini
 Devata
 Dunhuang dance
 Elf
 Fairy
 Gandharva - Celestial male companions of the apsaras
 Houri
 Nymph
 Peri, winged female creatures of Persian mythology
 Rusalka
 Swan maiden
 Tennin, a Japanese development of Indian apsaras
 Valkyrie from Norse mythology
 Vishnu
 Yakshini

Footnotes

References
 Marchal, Sappho. Khmer Costumes and Ornaments of the Devatas of Angkor Wat. First English edition. Orchid Press, 2005. 
 The Rig Veda in the English translation prepared by Ralph T. H. Griffith is available online at sacred-texts.com.
 The Mahabharata in the English translation prepared by Kisari Mohan Ganguli is available online at sacred-texts.com.
 The Monuments of the Angkor Group by Maurice Glaize is available online in English translation.

External links

 Chinese Apsaras depicted in Dunhuang Caves
 Comparison of Khmer Apsaras and Devata
 Costumes and Ornaments after the Devata of Angkor Wat by Sappho Marchal - Book review
 Indian Devata at Rajarani Temple in Orissa
 Japanese traditions of celestial maidens Tennin (apsara), Hiten (flying apsara), Tennyo (celestial maiden) & Karyobinga (bird body with angel head)
 Apsara Dance at Siem Reap, Cambodia
 Sanghyang Dedari, Balinese dance depicting bidadari (vidhyadari) celestial maiden

 
 Hindu goddesses
 Buddhist deities
 Female legendary creatures
 Nature spirits
 Non-human races in Hindu mythology
 Supernatural legends
 Female beauty